The Day of the Robot is the third studio album by Buckethead.

Reception

Alternative Press (11/96, p. 69) gave the album 5 stars out of 5 and said, "...has both a decidedly experimental side, as well as a knack for placing sounds in sturdy, though scary, compositional contexts....Buckethead seems to have found a new place for guitar gods..."

Track listing

Credits
Performers
 Buckethead: electric guitar
 Ninj: bass guitar, keyboards, drums
 Bill Laswell: low bass, drums, percussion

Production
Recorded at Coast Recorders, San Francisco, and Greenpoint Studio, Brooklyn
Rhythm tracks for 2, 3, 4 and 5 created in the UK by Ninj.
Produced by Bill Laswell.
Design, illustration and photography: Dave McKean @ Hourglass.
Source photographs supplied by Buckethead.
Front cover illustration of 'Buckethead No. 1': Bryan Frankenseuss Theiss.
Fonts: Elliot Earls.

References

Buckethead albums
1996 albums
Albums with cover art by Dave McKean
Albums produced by Bill Laswell
Subharmonic (record label) albums